Strawbs by Choice is a compilation album by The Strawbs.

Track listing

"The Man Who Called Himself Jesus" (Dave Cousins) – 3:51
"Another Day" (Cousins) – 3:16
"Forever" (Cousins, Tony Hooper) – 3:32
"Song of a Sad Little Girl" (Cousins) – 5:28
"The Shepherd's Song" (Cousins) – 4:34
"Benedictus" (Cousins) – 4:24
"Here It Comes" (Cousins) – 2:42
"The Actor" (Cousins) – 4:28
"Lay Down" (Cousins) – 4:31
"Lay a Little Light on Me" (Cousins)/"Hero's Theme" (Dave Lambert) – 3:27

Personnel

Dave Cousins – lead vocals, guitar (all tracks), dulcimer (2,4,6)
Tony Hooper - backing vocals, guitar (tracks 1-5-7)
Ron Chesterman – double bass (tracks 1-3)

Additional personnel 
Miller Anderson - lead guitar 
Dave Lambert – backing vocals, guitar (tracks 8-10)
Claire Deniz – cello (tracks 2,3)
John Ford – backing vocals, bass guitar (tracks 4-7,9)
Roger Glover – bass guitar (track 8)
Chas Cronk – bass guitar (track 10)
Rick Wakeman – piano, organ, harpsichord, celeste (tracks 3,4,5)
Blue Weaver – keyboards (tracks 6,7,9)
John Hawken – keyboards (track 10)
Richard Hudson - drums, percussion, sitar, tablas,(tracks 4-7,9)
Jon Hiseman : drums, percussions (track 8)
Rod Coombes – drums (track 10)

Release history

References
Strawbs by Choice on Strawbsweb

1974 compilation albums
Strawbs compilation albums
A&M Records compilation albums